LTAG can refer to:
 Incirlik Air Base, ICAO code
 Lexical tree-adjoining grammar, a grammar formalism